The 72nd Massachusetts General Court, consisting of the Massachusetts Senate and the Massachusetts House of Representatives, met in 1851 during the governorship of George S. Boutwell. Henry Wilson served as president of the Senate and Nathaniel Prentice Banks served as speaker of the House.

Senators

Representatives

See also
 32nd United States Congress
 List of Massachusetts General Courts

References

Further reading

External links
 
 

Political history of Massachusetts
Massachusetts legislative sessions
massachusetts
1851 in Massachusetts